Unione Sportiva Poggibonsi is an Italian association football club located in Poggibonsi, Tuscany. It currently plays in Serie D.

History 
The club was founded in 1925 as Unione Sportive Poggibonsi. It was renamed Poggibonsi Valdelsa in 2002 and played under this name, at the professional level in the Serie C2 in 2002–2003.

After that season, the team was excluded from playing Serie C2 by the federation because of financial problems, and admitted to Eccellenza. To begin the 2004/2005 season, it was refounded under his original name US Poggibonsi and promptly won the league in its first attempt. Poggibonsi played in the Serie D from 2004 to 2006, when the club, which ended the 2005–06 Serie D season in third place, was promoted because league winners Fortis Spoleto and second-placed Fortis Juventus were unable to play in the Serie C2 league. The club ended its 2006–07 Serie C2 campaign in thirteenth place, one point above the relegation playoff spots, and therefore remained in the Lega Pro Seconda Divisione (the rebranded Serie C2) in the 2007–08 season.

Poggibonsi were relegated back to Serie D on 2013–14, after completing their season in 16th place.

Colors and badge 
The team colors are red and yellow.

References

External links
 Official homepage

Football clubs in Tuscany
Association football clubs established in 1925
Serie C clubs
1925 establishments in Italy
Poggibonsi